Clathroterebra joelbartschi is a species of sea snail, a marine gastropod mollusk in the family Terebridae.

Original description
 Poppe G.T., Tagaro S.P. & Goto Y. (2018). New marine species from the Central Philippines. Visaya. 5(1): 91-135. page(s): 108, pl. 11 figs 1-3.

References

External links
 Worms Link

Terebridae
Gastropods described in 2018